Matukutūreia (also McLaughlins Mountain) is one of the volcanic cones in the Auckland volcanic field. It has a peak 73 metres above sea level, and was the site of a pā. The scoria cone was originally crescent-shaped and featured Māori terraces and kumara pits, before extensive quarrying reduced it to a pyramid-shaped mound big enough to support the summit water tank for Papatoetoe. A small part of the summit and the eastern side of the cone were left unquarried, plus a large area of lava flows to the south of the cone remains intact. These remaining parts have recently been transferred to Department of Conservation Management, primarily because of the high heritage values of the Matukuturua Stonefields gardens.

Matukutūreia and nearby Wiri Mountain are collectively known as Matukurua (also Ngā Matukurua).

From July to September 2010, the water tank was removed from the top of Matukutūreia, as part of an agreement when the land was handed over to the Department of Conservation.

References
City of Volcanoes: A geology of Auckland - Searle, Ernest J.; revised by Mayhill, R.D.; Longman Paul, 1981. First published 1964. .
Volcanoes of Auckland: The Essential Guide - Hayward, B.W., Murdoch, G., Maitland, G.; Auckland University Press, 2011.
Volcanoes of Auckland: A Field Guide. Hayward, B.W.; Auckland University Press, 2019, 335 pp. .

External links
Early photo of Matukutūreia showing its pre-quarried shape and Maori earthworks
Photographs of Matukutūreia held in Auckland Libraries' heritage collections.

Auckland volcanic field
Hills of the Auckland Region